Cornelis Reinier "Kees" van Kooten (born 10 August 1941) is a Dutch comedian, television actor, and writer. He formed the duo Van Kooten & De Bie with Wim de Bie from 1972 to 1998.

Biography
Cornelis Reinier van Kooten was born on 10 August 1941 in The Hague, Netherlands. He is the oldest child of Cornelis Reinier van Kooten en Anna Geertruida Snaauw. He has one sister, Anke, who is a year younger. He met his wife Barbara Kits in 1959 and married her on 18 October 1968. After their marriage they moved from The Hague to the polder village of Zuidoostbeemster, where their two children were born, Kasper in 1971 and Kim in 1974. Both children are well-known performers in the Netherlands. In 1978 the family moved to Hilversum and in 1996 to Amsterdam.

Van Kooten is best known for his collaboration with Wim de Bie. With him he formed the comedic duo Van Kooten en De Bie, often abbreviated as "Koot en Bie," in a variety of often very popular programs for the VPRO broadcasting organization from 1972 to 1998. Their collaboration had started in the Dalton Lyceum high school in The Hague, where they had formed a theater group named Cebrah. Every year between 1972 and 1985 they published a tear-off calendar named , combining the Dutch words for tear-off and splitting one's sides in laughter; Bescheurkalender is now officially included in Dutch dictionaries for any humorous block-calendar.

Books
Van Kooten has written some 47 books, including novels, short story and poetry collections, and autobiographical material. They are characterized by frequent wordplays and lighthearted satire of Dutch society. Few books have been translated in English. He often wrote under a wide variety of pseudonyms, including Koot, Jan Blommers, Hans van Dek, Tj. Hekking, Heer Kooten, Harry F. Kriele en Roman Tate. He also wrote several books together with Wim de Bie. Most of his books are published by De Bezige Bij. Among his better-known works are:

1969: Treitertrends ("trends in provocation")
1970: Treitertrends 2. .
1972: Laatste Treitertrends. .
1977: Koot droomt zich af. .
1979: Koot graaft zich autobio. .
1982: Veertig. .
1984: Modermismen. .
1986: Meer modermismen. .
1988: Zeven sloten. .
1989: Meest modermismen. .
1991: Zwemmen met droog haar. .
1993: Verplaatsingen. .
1994: Meer dan alle modermismen. .
1999: Levensnevel. .
2000: Annie. .
2007: Episodes: Een romance. .
2013: De Verrekijker.
2021: De tachtigjarige vrede..

Awards
Van Kooten has received many awards for his television shows and writing, individually and with de Bie. Among these are:
 1974 – Zilveren Nipkowschijf (Van Kooten en de Bie)
 1977 – Zilveren Nipkowschijf (Van Kooten en de Bie)
 1979 –  ("for effortless use of the Dutch language")
 1985 – Special Zilveren Nipkowschijf (Van Kooten en de Bie)
 1985 – Edison Award for Draaikonten (Van Kooten en de Bie)
 1999 –  ("for radio and television persona distinguished by their use of language")
 2004 – Gouden Ganzenveer ("for exceptional contribution to Dutch literature")
 2006 – Edison Award for Audiotheek, collected recordings of Van Kooten en de Bie

References

External links and sources

 Van Kooten & De Bie homepage
 Dutch National Library's files on Kees van Kooten

1941 births
Living people
20th-century Dutch novelists
20th-century Dutch male writers
21st-century Dutch novelists
Dutch male comedians
Dutch columnists
Dutch cabaret performers
Dutch male television actors
Writers from The Hague
Dutch male novelists
21st-century Dutch male writers
Dutch television writers
Male television writers